Ferit Sadi Melen (2 November 1906 – 3 September 1988) was a Turkish civil servant, politician and Prime Minister of Turkey.

Biography
After graduating from high school in Bursa, he obtained a degree in finance from the School of Political Science at Ankara University in 1931. Ferit Melen entered the state service right after his graduation, and was sent to Paris, France, for an internship at the Ministry of Finance there. After one year, he returned home and worked in several services of the Ministry of Finance as an inspector. In 1943, he was promoted to general director in the ministry.

Ferit Melen entered politics as a deputy from Van Province from the  Republican People's Party (Cumhuriyet Halk Partisi, CHP) following the 1950 general election. After the end of the legislative term, he did not run for the parliament in the 1954 election, and he returned to his profession to work as a chartered accountant. He practiced until his retirement in 1959. In 1957, he was elected once again to the parliament as deputy from Van.

Ferit Melen was minister of finance in the two cabinets of İsmet İnönü between 25 June 1962 and 20 February 1965 in the 27th and 28th governments without affiliation to the parliament. He left his party CHP along with 47 other colleagues to co-found on 12  May 1967 "Güven Partisi" GP ("Reliance Party"), which was renamed  Republican Reliance Party (Cumhuriyetçi Güven Partisi, CGP) after merging with "Cumhuriyetçi Parti" CP ("Republican Party") on 28 February 1973. He served also as minister of national defense in the two cabinets of Nihat Erim from 26 March 1971 to 22 May 1972. Following the resignation of Nihat Erim, he was appointed prime minister of a military-approved coalition government that lasted until 15 April 1973. Between 31 March 1975 and 21 June 1977, he served a second time as minister of national defense in the cabinet of Süleyman Demirel.

In the time from 7 June 1964 to 14 October 1979, Ferit Melen was a member of the senate representing Van Province. On 12 July 1980, he was appointed again senator that ended on 12 September 1980 with the military coup. Ferit Melen was elected to Turkish Grand National Assembly in the 1983 elections as a candidate of the Nationalist Democracy Party (MDP).

He was succeeded by his son Mithat Melen, a former high ranked civil servant and academics, who in 2002 tried to enter politics with the Nationalist Movement Party (MHP).

The airport of Van is named after him.

See also
 Biyografi.info - Biography of Ferit Melen 
 Terms of office

References

1906 births
1988 deaths
20th-century prime ministers of Turkey
People from Van, Turkey
Republican People's Party (Turkey) politicians
Republican Reliance Party politicians
Nationalist Democracy Party politicians
Prime Ministers of Turkey
Ministers of National Defence of Turkey
Ministers of Finance of Turkey
Deputies of Van
Members of the Senate of the Republic (Turkey)
Turkish civil servants
Ankara University Faculty of Political Sciences alumni
Members of the 27th government of Turkey
Members of the 28th government of Turkey
Members of the 34th government of Turkey
Members of the 35th government of Turkey
Members of the 39th government of Turkey
Burials at Cebeci Asri Cemetery